Kuiper Systems LLC is a subsidiary of Amazon that was established in 2019 to deploy a large broadband satellite internet constellation to provide broadband internet connectivity. The deployment is also referred to by its project name "Project Kuiper".

Amazon has signed launch contracts with three launch service providers for a total of 91 launches over the next decade in order to build out the entire constellation, now planned to contain 3,236 satellites. , no date has been set for when initial launches of the operational constellation will begin.

Two initial prototype satellites “KuiperSat-1” and “KuiperSat-2” were originally planned to be launched in the fourth quarter of 2022 with ABL Space Systems on their RS1 rocket. On 12 October 2022, Amazon updated this plan to be on the initial launch of ULA's Vulcan Centaur launch vehicle in "early 2023."

Kuiper satellites are likely to be compatible with and interconnect via optical links to Space Development Agency satellites.

History 
Amazon announced in April 2019 that they would fund and deploy a large broadband satellite internet constellation called Project Kuiper. It is expected to take up to a decade to fully deploy all 3,236 satellites planned for the full constellation in order to provide internet to "tens of millions of people who lack basic access to broadband internet". Amazon has not announced if they intend to sell broadband service directly to consumers, but they will "offer broadband service through partnerships with other companies".

In December 2019, information became public that Amazon was asking the FCC to waive requirements (eg. to have applied by 2016) that SpaceX and OneWeb had to follow in order to get their large satellite internet constellations licensed.  

On 30 July 2020, Amazon announced that it would be investing more than US$10 billion in Project Kuiper, post receiving an authorization from the Federal Communications Commission (FCC) for a Project Kuiper constellation of 3,236 satellites, to provide broadband internet access across the globe. A condition included in the FCC's authorization was a non-interference clause that required the satellites to not interfere with previously authorized satellite ventures.

In December 2020, Amazon unveiled a high-level overview of the low-cost flat-panel antenna that it plans to use for the Project Kuiper satellite constellation. It is a Ka-band phased-array antenna that is much smaller than traditional designs for antennas that operate at 17–30 GHz. The antenna will be ~ in width and is expected to support up to 400 megabits per second of data bandwidth at over 5x less cost than traditional state-of-the-art flat-panel antennas. Amazon also announced that they intend to be "launch agnostic" and would not plan to exclusively use launch capacity from Jeff Bezos' Blue Origin company, but rather were open to launch capability offers from all providers.

On 19 April 2021, Amazon announced that it had contracted with ULA for nine launches of Kuiper satellites on Atlas V launch vehicles from Cape Canaveral Space Force Station in Florida, and noted that it will "continue to explore all options" for launching the remainder of the satellites.

On 5 April 2022, Amazon announced a massive set of launch contracts with three launch providers for a total of 83 launches over the next decade. The agreements foresee the launch of a full constellation at buildout of 3236 satellites, and include 18 launches of the European Ariane 6, 12 launches of Blue Origin's New Glenn (with options on 15 additional flights), and 38 launches on the Vulcan launch vehicle from United Launch Alliance.  All three of these medium- or heavy-lift launch vehicles have yet to make their initial flight.

Operations 
Kuiper is planned to work in concert with Amazon's previously announced large network of 12 satellite ground station facilities (the "AWS Ground Station unit") announced in November 2018. Amazon filed communications license documents with the U.S. regulatory authorities the FCC in July 2019, which included information that the wholly owned Amazon subsidiary that intended to deploy the satellite constellation was Kuiper Systems LLC, based in Seattle, Washington.

The president of Kuiper Systems is Rajeev Badyal, a former vice president of SpaceX's Starlink satellite internet constellation who was fired in 2018. In December 2019, Amazon announced that the team were expected to move headquarters to a larger R&D facility in Redmond, Washington, in 2020. In October 2022, Amazon confirmed the move to a 219,000-square-foot facility, but did not specify the exact location. They additionally announced plans on expanding to a 172,000-square-foot facility in Kirkland, Washington dedicated to manufacturing.

See also 

 Kuiper belt
 OneWeb satellite constellation
 SpaceX Starlink

References 

Aerospace companies of the United States
Amazon (company)
Private spaceflight companies
Communications satellite constellations
Communications satellites in low Earth orbit
Satellite Internet access